The women's 200 metres at the 2012 African Championships in Athletics was held at the Stade Charles de Gaulle on 30 June and 1 July.

Medalists

Records

Schedule

Results

Round 1
First 3 in each heat (Q) and 6 best performers (q) advance to the Semifinals.

Wind:Heat 1: -0.1 m/s, Heat 2: -0.2 m/s, Heat 3: -0.1 m/s, Heat 4: 0.0 m/s, Heat 5: -0.2 m/s, Heat 6: +0.1 m/s

Semifinals
First 2 in each heat (Q) and 2 best performers (q) advance to the Final.

Wind:Heat 1: -1.4 m/s, Heat 2: -0.5 m/s, Heat 3: -0.9 m/s

Final
Wind: -0.7 m/s

References

Results

200 Women
200 metres at the African Championships in Athletics
2012 in women's athletics